The 16"/50 caliber Mark 7 – United States Naval Gun is the main armament of the Iowa-class battleships and was the planned main armament of the cancelled .

Description

Due to a lack of communication during design, the Bureau of Ordnance assumed the Iowa class would use the /50 Mark 2 guns constructed for the 1920 South Dakota-class battleships. However, the Bureau of Construction and Repair assumed that the ships would carry a compact 16-in/50 turret and designed the ships with barbettes too small to accommodate the 16-in/50 Mark 2 three-gun turret that the Bureau of Ordnance was actually working on. The lightweight 16-in/50 Mark 7 was designed to resolve this conflict.

At maximum range the projectile spent almost  minutes in flight. Each turret required a crew of 79 men to operate. The turrets cost US$1.4 million each, excluding the cost of the guns.

The turrets were described as "three-gun" rather than "triple" because each barrel could be elevated independently. The ships could fire any combination of their guns, up to a broadside of all nine. The turret interiors were subdivided and designed to permit the independent loading, elevation and firing of each gun. Each turret was fitted with an optical range finder, ballistic analog computer, and a switchboard. The rangefinder and ballistic computer permitted the turret's gun captain and crew to locally engage targets should battle damage disrupt communication with the ship's primary or auxiliary fire control centers. The firing switchboard allowed any remaining fire control computer to send data to or control the firing computers of other turrets in the event of battle damage to the primary and secondary artillery plotting rooms.

Contrary to popular belief, the ships did not move sideways noticeably when a broadside was fired; this was an illusion. With the enormous mass of the vessel and the damping effect of the water around the hull, the pressure wave generated by the gunfire was felt as just a slight change in lateral velocity.  The sea surface on the side of the ship to which the guns are trained is roiled by the guns' muzzle blast, which creates the illusion of motion in still photos.

The guns could be elevated from −5 degrees to +45 degrees, moving at up to 12 degrees per second. The turrets could rotate about 300 degrees at about 4 degrees per second and could be fired back beyond the beam, sometimes called firing "over the shoulder". A red stripe on the wall of each turret, inches from the railing, marked the limit of the gun's recoil as a safety warning to the turret's crew.

Complementing the 16-in/50 caliber Mark 7 gun was a fire control computer, the Ford Instrument Company Mark 8 Range Keeper. This analog computer was used to direct the fire from the battleship's big guns, taking into account factors including the speed of the targeted ship, the projectile's travel time, and air resistance. The results of this advance were telling: the range keeper was able to track and fire at targets at greater range and with increased accuracy, day or night. This gave the US Navy a major advantage in the latter half of WWII, as the Japanese did not develop radar or automated fire control to the level of the US Navy. With a few exceptions, such as the Japanese battleship Yamato, Japanese warships at best used basic radar sets that were not connected to fire control, still relying on optical rangefinders. Even the few Japanese warships that had radar-assisted guns did not directly link their fire control and radar, having to input the locations of targets spotted on radar into the fire control manually.

The 16"/50 caliber's advanced fire control was designed to allow it to fire accurately at its maximum range. which exceeded any opposing ship's effective firing range. However, this proved not to be possible. The US soon learned that shell dispersion was not something fire control, no matter how advanced, could solve (this remains true: modern guns with more advanced radar cannot fire accurately from maximum range, being limited to a shorter accurate effective range). Several live-firing tests were conducted by Iowa-class battleships in which the 16"/50 displayed shockingly low hit rates from the extreme ranges it was designed to fight from, even with its very advanced radar. Most notably USS Iowa bombarded the former battleship target Nevada over five days, with an extremely low hit rate, failing to sink the target ship, demonstrating that a ship armed with these guns could not fire accurately at an enemy ship while remaining out of range of the enemy's guns.

During their reactivation in the 1980s, the up-to-date Mark 160 Fire Control System was used to guide the fire of the Iowa-class battleship Mark 7 guns.

Mark 8 "Super-heavy" shell
The Mark 7 gun was originally intended to fire the  Mark 5 armor-piercing shell. However, the shell-handling system for these guns was redesigned to use the "super-heavy"  APCBC (Armor Piercing, Capped, Ballistic Capped) Mark 8 shell before any of the 's keels were laid down. The large-caliber guns were designed to fire either an armor-piercing round for anti-ship and anti-structure work, and a high-explosive round for use against unarmored targets and shore bombardment.

The  and  classes could also fire the 2,700-pound Mark 8 shell with the 16"/45 caliber Mark 6 gun, although with a shorter range. The Mark 6 gun was not as heavy as the Mark 7, which helped both battleship classes to conform to the limits of the Washington Naval Treaty. However, the two treaty-era battleships fired their shells at a lower muzzle velocity, which made their plunging fire superior to that of the 16"/50 caliber gun.

The Mark 8 shells gave the North Carolina, South Dakota, and Iowa classes the second-heaviest broadside of all battleship classes, even though the two ships were treaty battleships, exceeded only by the Yamato-class super-battleships.

Construction

The Mark 7 gun was a built-up gun and was constructed of liner, tube, jacket, three hoops, two locking rings, tube and liner locking ring, yoke ring and screw box liner. Some components were autofretted. Typical of United States naval weapons built in the 1940s, the bore was chromium-plated for longer barrel life. It had a Welin breech block that opened downwards and was hydraulically operated. The screw box liner and breech plug was segmented with stepped screw threads arranged in fifteen sectors of 24 degrees each.

Service history
Some reports indicated the near misses caused splinter damage and casualties to the crew. Nowaki was able to escape due to the range and her speed. The action against Nowaki was part of Operation Hailstone. This is the only surface engagement that Iowa-class battleships are known to have engaged in. In the action, Iowa sank the Japanese training cruiser Katori, while New Jersey helped to sink destroyer Maikaze, and the auxiliary cruiser Akagi Maru.

The gun was also used as the basis for Project HARP, an experimental gun-based space-launch research program.

See also

List of naval guns
List of World War II artillery
46 cm/45 Type 94 naval gun
Armament of the Iowa class battleship
List of the largest cannon by caliber
16-inch/45-caliber Mark 6 gun

Weapons of comparable role, performance and era
40.6 cm SK C/34 gun German equivalent

Notes

References

External links

NavWeaps
Video The 16"/50 Gun & Turret: US Navy Instructional Film
USS Missouri rolling fire
 16in Barrels: Construction and Maintenance Battleship New Jersey Museum
 

Naval guns of the United States
Cold War
World War II naval weapons
400 mm artillery
Weapons and ammunition introduced in 1943